Aero Commander was an aircraft manufacturer formed in 1944. In subsequent years, it became a subsidiary of Rockwell International and Gulfstream Aerospace.  The company ceased aircraft production in 1986.

History
Aero was formed in Culver City, California, in 1944 to design and manufacture a light twin-engined transport aircraft. Ted Smith, a former project engineer at Douglas Aircraft Company, assembled a team of 14 engineers to design what would be the Aero Commander. Preliminary design was completed in 1946. The first prototype took flight on April 23, 1948, and was certified by the Civil Aeronautics Administration (CAA) in June, 1950. Three men funded the company's early efforts: Philadelphia attorney George Pew and Oklahoma City brothers William and Rufus Travis Amis.

In September 1950, it became the Aero Design and Engineering Company of Oklahoma. Its facilities consisted of an aircraft hangar and  manufacturing facility located at what is now Wiley Post Airport near Oklahoma City. In August 1951, the first production Aero Commander, the piston-engined model 520, rolled off the assembly line. It was designed as a business class twin-engine aircraft for corporate travelers.

In 1954, the 520 was replaced by the 560 and 560A featuring a larger cabin and more powerful Lycoming piston engines. In 1955, the U.S. Air Force selected the Aero Commander as the personal transport for President Dwight D. Eisenhower, ordering 15 aircraft, two of which were used by The White House. This aircraft was a military version of the Aero Commander and was assigned a liaison function. It was used by Eisenhower to travel from Washington, D.C. to his farm at Gettysburg, Pennsylvania. In 1958, the Company introduced the first pressurized business aircraft in the form of the model 720 Alti-Cruiser.

The company was acquired by Rockwell-Standard in 1958 and changed its name to Aero Commander Inc. in late 1960. The aircraft added fuel injection engines and other modifications to increase performance, resulting in the 1960 introduction of the Twin Commander. With the advent of the small gas turbine engine, the 680 T model was released in 1964, followed by the 690 series in 1971, and the JetProp series in 1979. 

The company later incorporated other aircraft types developed at smaller companies and marketed them as components of the Aero Commander line.  It also developed a business-twinjet, the 1121 Jet Commander. The production of this aircraft was delayed with the company finally delivering to its first customer, Timken Roller Bearing Corporation, on January 11, 1965. Aero Commander sold the manufacturing rights to Israel Aircraft Industries (IAI), who produced it as the Westwind. 

In February 1981, Rockwell International sold the Aero Commander division to Gulfstream Aerospace. The final Twin Commander model 1000, released in the early 1980s, was powered by Dash 10 engines. In December 1985, Gulfstream Aerospace was acquired by Chrysler Corp. With a new focus on the business jet market, production of the Twin Commander ended in 1986.

In 1989, the Twin Commander Aircraft subsidiary of Gulfstream was acquired by Precision Aerospace Corporation. With this acquisition, the company transformed from an aircraft manufacturer to an OEM parts, service, and support provider. In 2003, the company was reincorporated as Twin Commander Aircraft, LLC. In 2005, the company was acquired from Precision in a management buyout.

Aircraft

Ag Commander was a brand name used by Aero Commander for their line of agricultural aircraft. Two unrelated aircraft were marketed under this name: the CallAir A-9, sold as the Ag Commander A-9 and B-9, and the Ayres Thrush (aka the Snow S-2), sold as the Ag Commander S-2. Both aircraft were originally the products of smaller manufacturers that Aero Commander had purchased. The Ag Commander brand was dropped in 1970 when Rockwell dissolved the Aero Commander division.

See also
 Ayres Corporation
 Intermountain Manufacturing Company
 Meyers Aircraft Company
 Snow Aeronautical
 Volaircraft

References

Other sources
Rockwell U-9A Aero Commander

External links

 Encyclopedia of Oklahoma History and Culture – Aero Commander
 The Aero Commander Line – a short history 

Defunct aircraft manufacturers of the United States
Manufacturing companies established in 1944
Defunct manufacturing companies based in Oklahoma
Manufacturing companies disestablished in 1986